Metermaids is an American underground hip hop duo based in Brooklyn, New York. It consists of rappers Sentence and Swell.

History
Metermaids released Nightlife and Nightlife in Illinoise (a song-by-song mashup with Sufjan Stevens' album Illinoise) in 2008. The duo released the Rooftop Shake album on Strange Famous Records in September 2011. It is produced by 9th Wonder and M. Stine and features guest appearances from Rob Swift, Buck 65 and Sage Francis.

Discography

Albums
 Nightlife (2008)
 Rooftop Shake (2012)
 We Brought Knives (2014)

Mixtapes
 Nightlife in Illinoise (2008)
 Hello (2010)
 Billy Mitchell Presents: Sleigh Bells (2010)

EPs
 Metermaids EP (2006)
 Live at Arlene's Grocery (2009)
 Smash Smash Bang (2009)

Singles
 "Turn the Lights Out!" (2009)

Guest appearances
 B. Dolan - "Bad Things" from House of Bees Vol. 2 (2012)
 Prolyphic & Buddy Peace - "Death of the Boombox" from Working Man (2013)

References

External links
 
 Metermaids on Strange Famous Records

Alternative hip hop groups
American musical duos
Musical groups from Brooklyn
Musical groups established in 2006
2006 establishments in New York City